Rapid eye movement may refer to:

 Rapid eye movement sleep or REM sleep
 Saccade, a fast movement of an eye
 Rapid Eye Movement (album), an album by Riverside
 Rapid Eye Movement, a progressive rock British band formed in 1980 by Dave Stewart, Pip Pyle, Rick Biddulph and Jakko Jakszyk
 R.E.M., an American rock band

See also
 REM (disambiguation)